The 1988 All-Ireland Senior Football Championship Final was the 101st All-Ireland Final and the deciding match of the 1988 All-Ireland Senior Football Championship, an inter-county Gaelic football tournament for the top teams in Ireland.

Match 1

Summary
Cork scored a goal three minutes in and Brian Stafford scored a controversial equaliser

David Beggy brought the sides level to force a replay.

Details

Match 2

Summary
Meath's Gerry McEntee was sent off in the seventh minute of the replay. He was guilty of striking Niall Cahalane.

The match was dominated by Meath's aggressive play.

According to Colm Keys, the replay was "one of the most brutal finals" due to Meath's style of play.

Meath won the replay by a point. Colm O'Rourke scored Meath's last point — which proved to be the winning score, when Cork began to close in on Meath towards the end.

In 2018, Martin Breheny listed the replay as the tenth greatest All-Ireland Senior Football Championship Final.

Details

References

All-Ireland Senior Football Championship Final
All-Ireland Senior Football Championship Final, 1988
All-Ireland Senior Football Championship Finals
All-Ireland Senior Football Championship Finals
Cork county football team matches
Meath county football team matches